The following is a list of notable events and releases of the year 2016 in Finnish music.

Events

February
 6 – The Uuden Musiikin Kilpailu 2016 Semi-finals was initiated February 6. The next two semi-finals is executed February 13 and 20.
 10 – The Ojai Music Festival announced the appointment of Esa-Pekka Salonen as its music director for the 2018 season.
 27 – The Uuden Musiikin Kilpailu 2016 Final will take place on February 27.

Mach

April 
 13 – The Tampere Biennale started (April 13 – 17).
 22 – The singer-songwriter Suvi Åkerman, mentored by Tarja Turunen, won the final of season 5 of The Voice of Finland.

May

June

July
 8 - The Baltic Jazz festival started in Dalsbruk (July 8 – 10).

November
 3 - Tampere Jazz Happening is opened (November 3–6).

Album releases

January

February

June

Deaths

February
 4 – Ulf Söderblom (86), Finnish conductor

May
 9 – Riki Sorsa (63), Finnish singer ("Reggae OK") (cancer)
 14 – Lasse Mårtenson (81), Finnish singer, composer, actor, and theater conductor

July
 27 – Einojuhani Rautavaara, Finnish composer, 87

See also
Music of Finland
Finland in the Eurovision Song Contest 2016

References

 
Finnish music
Finnish